A Terrible Beauty is the first, and so far only, release from UK band The Uncle Devil Show.  It was released on P3 Music in 2004.

Track listing
 "Leonardo's Bicycle"
 "Gilbert O'Sullivan"
 "Tambourine"
 "Bimbo in the Limo"
 "Plus Ça Change"
 "Angie Baby"
 "She Cuts Her Own Fringe"
 "Strange Umbrella"
 "Dandelion"
 "Sidelong Glances of a Pigeon Kicker"
 "When Raymond Comes Around"
 "I Had a Drink About You Last Night"

A joke?
The Uncle Devil Show is a trio consisting of Jason Barr, Langton Herring and Terrence, the three of whom bear striking resemblances to three semi-famous to famous contemporary Scottish musicians.  The band have a decidedly surreal quality surrounding them, and their songs tend to deal with topics and themes uncommonly found in popular music – namely, the theft of a bicycle which grants freedom but which breeds contempt, feelings of sympathy for wasps and bees, the practical application of Gilbert O'Sullivan's music and its ability to help sift out inappropriate partners, talentless TV 'talent', and cross-dressing desperates.  The record contains the odd occasion of incongruous (and congruous) swearing.  But while some might dismiss their efforts as satire or parody, or a one-off joke, there is a lot of evidence that this venture has a lot of thought and heart behind it, and the music and some of the lyrics follow a very well-trodden pop path.

The music itself features catchy guitars, vocal harmonies and, at times, rising orchestration and strings.  The lyrics explore love affairs gone wrong, from being misled by signs that things were going to work out, only to find they did not, to being in love with a woman who seems desirably, and uncharacteristically for pop songs, real and lovable.  Many reviews have referred to the rewards to be gained from multiple listens.

Production
A Terrible Beauty was produced by The Uncle Devil Show and mastered by Paul McGeechan.  All tracks are credited to Herring/Barr, while Angie Baby is a cover of the Helen Reddy song, written by Alan O'Day.

References

External links
Shindig Review 
MusicOMH.com Review 
This is Ull Review
Babysue Review
Fried Egg Media Review
The Uncle Devil Show's Myspace page

Terrible Beauty, A